Christian Adolph Diriks (1 November 1775 – 16 December 1837) was a Norwegian lawyer and statesman. He served as a representative at the Norwegian Constitutional Assembly in 1814.

Biography
Christian Adolph Diriks was born in Copenhagen, Denmark. He was the son of maritime captain Boye Boyesen Dyriks (1744–80) and Marie Elisabeth Stoppel (d. 1797). After studying law at the University of Copenhagen, he earned his cand. jur. in 1795. He worked for some years in the city court of Copenhagen. In 1806,  Diriks was appointed Assessor in Kristiansand. In 1812, he was made Director of the Justice Court (Justisråd) for Laurvig (now Larvik). Diriks was Magistrate in Laurvig  and Judge from 1812 to 1815.

It was from Laurvig that he was elected to the Constitutional Assembly. As the legal secretary of the Constitutional Committee, he played an important part in shaping the language of the Norwegian Constitution. Diriks was the Assembly's resident expert on foreign constitutions, and emphasized civil liberties. He was responsible for the inclusion of §100, concerning freedom of speech, and §102, guarding against unreasonable searches and seizures. He was later made president of the Assembly, with responsibility for passing the Constitution.

Shortly after the dissolution of the Assembly, Diriks was appointed professor of law at the newly founded Royal Frederick University (today's University of Oslo), but continuing government responsibilities prevented him from taking up the position. Among the positions he held were Minister of the Police and Minister of Justice from 1814 to 1818, and Minister of Education and Church Affairs from 1825 to 1836. He did not enjoy the support of Count Wedel-Jarlsberg, however and when Wedel-Jarlsberg was appointed Governor-general of Norway in 1836, Diriks was forced to retire.

Personal life
Christian Adolph Diriks was married to Maren Cathrine Tax (1772-1848). They were the parents of nine children including Norwegian government minister Christian Ludvig Diriks and Norwegian maritime officer Carl Frederik Diriks. Christian Adolph Diriks was also the grandfather of the artist Edvard Diriks.

References

External links
Representantene på Eidsvoll 1814 (Cappelen Damm AS)
 Men of Eidsvoll (eidsvollsmenn)

Related Reading
Holme Jørn (2014) De kom fra alle kanter - Eidsvollsmennene og deres hus  (Oslo: Cappelen Damm) 
Weidling, Tor  (2000) Eneveldets menn i Norge: Sivile sentralorganer og embetsmenn 1660–1814 (Oslo: Riksarkivaren) 

1775 births
1837 deaths
People from Copenhagen
University of Copenhagen alumni
Presidents of the Storting
19th-century Norwegian judges
Directors of government agencies of Norway
Government ministers of Norway
Fathers of the Constitution of Norway
Royal Norwegian Society of Sciences and Letters
Ministers of Justice of Norway
Ministers of Education of Norway